John Annand Fraser, MBE, TD was Moderator of the General Assembly of the Church of Scotland from 1958 to 1959. He was born into a clerical family on 21 June 1894 and educated at Robert Gordon's College, Inverness Royal Academy and the Universities of Aberdeen and Edinburgh. During The Great War he served with the Gordon Highlanders.

Ordained in 1921, he was initially an Assistant Minister at St Matthew's, Edinburgh, 1921. After this he was held incumbencies at Humbie and Hamilton, during which time he was the Moderator and his son, later Sir Charles Annand Fraser, attending the Hamilton Academy. From 1960 to 1970 he was Minister of Aberdalgie. He died on 3 October 1985.

References

1894 births
Members of the Order of the British Empire
1985 deaths
People educated at Inverness Royal Academy
People educated at Robert Gordon's College
Alumni of the University of Aberdeen
Alumni of the University of Edinburgh
British Army personnel of World War I
Moderators of the General Assembly of the Church of Scotland
Gordon Highlanders officers
20th-century Ministers of the Church of Scotland